David Gee is the former sheriff of Hillsborough County, Florida. He was sheriff from 2004 until his retirement on September 30, 2017, having worked in the Hillsborough County Sheriff's Office for more than twenty years prior to his election.

Gee's tenure was a successful one: the crime rate in the county has fallen in each of the last nine years. He has been praised for his office's "enlightened approach to homelessness", but criticized for "traditional criminalization tactics for low-level offenses such as misdemeanor marijuana possession".

Gee is a graduate of the University of Tampa. He is a Republican.

References

Florida sheriffs
Living people
University of Tampa alumni
Florida Republicans
People from Tampa, Florida
Year of birth missing (living people)